Melaka Fray is a fictional character created by Joss Whedon and Karl Moline for the 2003 comic book limited series Fray, a spin-off set in a futuristic setting of the shared fictional universe in which the TV series Buffy the Vampire Slayer and Angel are established, referred to as the "Buffy verse." The character's story was later continued in the graphic novel Tales of the Slayers and in a Buffy crossover in the Season Eight "Time of Your Life" story arc, as well as in its motion comic companion, in which she is voiced by Michelle Wong.

In Fray, Melaka is depicted as the latest in the mystical line of vampire slayers, chosen ones born with the strength and skill to fight the forces of evil, over 200 years in the future. However, unlike other vampire slayers, Mel is unusual in that she was one of a pair of twins; her brother Harth somehow inherited the psychic aspects of a slayer's abilities, leaving her with only the strength, agility, and other physical attributes. Prior to Mel, a slayer had not been "called" to receive her powers for centuries.

Biography

Early life
Melaka Fray, born in the 23rd century, grew up in Verzi (Riverside), a small ghetto-type district in Haddyn (Manhattan of the future). She grew up with her older sister Erin and her slightly older twin Harth. In her teenage years, Melaka noticed that she had enhanced physical abilities over everyone else, but chose to believe that she was good only at things like that. Because of the low social status and the poor background from which her family came, she was forced to go “grabbing” for food, which earned disapproval from her sister. At the age of fifteen, she took Harth with her on a grab, and the twins were attacked by a "lurk" (aka vampire) called Icarus. Melaka tried to fight Icarus off but ultimately lost to him and was thrown off a building while Icarus fed off of Harth, killing him. Melaka survived her fall, only to be blamed by Erin for Harth's death. The two sisters parted ways, with Erin joining "the laws" (i.e. the police equivalent) while Melaka continued her life of crime.

Calling
At the age of nineteen Melaka was a professional thief hired by a “radie” (i.e. radiation caused mutant) named Gunther. Melaka also often looked after a fellow girl from Versi named Loo. Melaka was approached by a demon named Urkonn who told her that lurks were in fact ancient demons known as "vampires" and that she was destined to fight them. Mel was at first reluctant to accept or even believe that she was really "the Slayer", especially as she had never experienced any of the prophetic dreams that Urkonn described. However, after coming across a lurk while on a job for Gunther and being reminded of Harth's death, she agreed to train with Urkonn. While fighting, Melaka came face to face with Icarus and was horrified by the sight of her brother's killer, forcing Urkonn to jump to her defense. After recovering, Melaka used Gunther to track down Icarus, but she learned that Gunther had betrayed her to the law. As Erin took her sister away, they were attacked by a group of lurks, who kidnapped Melaka and took her to their master, Harth. Harth revealed to his sister that, as her twin, he had received her Slayer dreams and was aware of vampire history. When he was bitten by Icarus, he knew that the only way to survive was to ingest their blood, thus becoming one of them.  Due to his dreams, Harth had become leader to the lurks and was determined to bring back the Old Ones. Which he then reveals his obsession with her, claiming he had always loved her and loves causing her pain. After the shock of meeting her supposedly dead brother, Melaka escaped and informed Erin of what had happened. Erin refused to believe her, so Melaka returned home and rejoined Urkonn, where she discovered Loo's lifeless body in her apartment.  This motivated her to wage war on the lurks as revenge for what they had done to her loved ones.

Soon afterwards, Melaka was granted the Scythe—an ancient Slayer weapon—to aid her in the upcoming battle by Urkonn. Melaka tried to unite the city of Versi against the lurks but was ignored, but after watching Melaka fight against the lurks they realized what a true threat they were. This attracted the attention of Icarus, but before he and Melaka could truly face off, Erin appeared and crashed her flying car on top of Icarus as revenge for murdering her brother.  Melaka led a small group of people, including members of the law, against an army of lurks, while Harth attempted to unleash the Old Ones on Earth. Melaka defeated Harth's giant demon, but Harth escaped after claiming that things were not over between them, but not before kissing her then running off. Afterward, Melaka confronted Urkonn, informing him that she had figured out he was the one who murdered Loo.  Urkonn claimed that he needed to do whatever he could to motivate her against the lurks, and Melaka killed him, doing it quickly because she considered Urkonn a "friend". She returned to her old job as a thief, but continued fighting lurks and preparing for anything else which came her way.

Discovering her past

Some time after the events of Fray, Gunther sent Melaka on a "special" grab, one he believed she would enjoy. Opening a chest, she was confronted with a bizarre "Spider-Monkey" creature which stole her scythe and led her through Haddyn to a building containing the Watchers' diaries.  Reading about the lives of past Slayers, Melaka came to the conclusion that, although she was the only one of her kind in existence, she was not alone.

Meeting Buffy Summers
Sometime after Fray and Tales, Melaka and Erin have teamed up to track down Harth. In one attempt to find him they hijack a moving van and discover a lurk, who they interrogate about Harth's whereabouts, the lurk reveals that Harth has teamed up with a mysterious crazy woman, who speaks in riddles and is very powerful. Mel and Erin head back to Mel's new home, the building in which she discovered the watchers diaries in Tales, to find out who the mysterious woman is. Erin meets Melaka's new pet, Gates, the 'spider-monkey' demon seen in Tales. Melaka reads about a building where she believes she can find answers to where Harth is. Erin drops her off on the building rooftop and leaves her to a fight an oncoming demon. Melaka and the demon fight but the demon is then transported away and is then replaced with Buffy Summers. After a small fight Buffy and Melaka both discover that they are both Slayers and the two soon trust each other. Melaka asks Buffy to follow her which she does, after some initial difficulty. Melaka takes Buffy to Gunther.  Buffy reviews the Watcher Diaries, but finds no mention of the army of Slayers she created, to her severe disappointment.  Melaka takes her on a mission to intercept some Lurks.  However, she and Buffy come to disagreements about what action to take.  Buffy states that they need to look at the big picture and allow the Lurks to continue their attack on an emergency vehicle in order to follow them to their larger hideout, whereas Melaka opts to stop the Lurks where they are and save the lives of the paramedics.  She leaps from their car, separating her from Buffy.

After defeating the Lurks, she encounters the "madwoman" who is revealed to be a once again dark and insane Willow Rosenberg.  She convinces Melaka to knock Buffy out, claiming that Buffy's return to the past and subsequent actions will cause the present/future world Melaka lives in to disappear.  Melaka insists that she won't kill another Slayer, though Willow claims she need only keep her captive until after the temporal rift reopens and closes again, trapping Buffy in the future.  However, a skirmish between Harth, who arrives angered at Willow for misleading him, and Gunther, who attacks Harth in retribution of an early ambush, allows Buffy to go free, attacking Erin and Melaka and escaping.  Melaka ambushes Buffy at the site of the temporal rift claiming that she'll defeat her in order to "save the world" (the present).  The two fight one another while Willow watches.  Both note the other's skill, where Buffy has the advantage of a Slayer's memories and Melaka has the advantage of purpose and home turf.  However, the rift opens and Buffy defeats Melaka.  Willow intercepts Buffy, who is forced to reluctantly kill her in order to return to the past.  Melaka is too late to stop her, feeling that she has failed once again.  However, Erin notes that they still exist despite Buffy's return to the past; the timeline is apparently intact in spite of Buffy's knowledge and actions, and thus their future remains.

Powers and abilities
Melaka is a Slayer and so possesses the physical powers of one, which includes superhuman strength, speed, agility, reflexes, durability, and accelerated healing.  Her usual weapons include a blaster pistol and the mystical Slayer scythe.

Notably, she does not possess the usual psychic powers of Slayers such as prophetic dreams, as these abilities instead went to her twin brother Harth. She believes that this makes her special, as she has not inherited any traditional Slayer fighting techniques but instead an experienced street fighter, making her unique and unpredictable.  Indeed, when Buffy Summers accidentally travels to her time period, she finds it difficult to predict Melaka's moves.

Melaka is also an accomplished thief.

Appearances
Fray has made thirteen canonical appearances in the Buffyverse.

Fray
"Big City Girl"
"The Calling"
"Ready, Steady..."
"Out of the Past"
"The Worst of It"
"Alarums"
"The Gateway"
"All Hell"

Tales of the Slayers
"Tales"

Buffy the Vampire Slayer Season Eight
"Time of Your Life", Parts 1–4

Buffy the Vampire Slayer Season Twelve
"The Reckoning"
"Finale"

See also
Buffyverse Slayer Mythology
Tales of the Slayers - Fray makes an appearance in "Tales"

References

External links
 Article about the miniseries from Dark Horse Comics' official website
  Joss Whedon's Fray Unofficial Fansite

Buffy the Vampire Slayer characters
Slayers (Buffyverse)
Female characters in comics
Twin characters in comics
Fictional thieves
Fictional characters from New York City
2003 comics debuts
Comics characters introduced in 2003
Fictional people from the 23rd-century